Olaf Tree Feller (Old Norse: Óláfr trételgja, Swedish: Olof Trätälja, Norwegian: Olav Tretelgja, all meaning Olaf Woodwhittler) was the son of the Swedish king Ingjald illråde, ruler of the House of Yngling in the 7th century according to Ynglingatal, a Skaldic poem detailing the kings of that house.

Heimskringla
His mother was Gauthild, a princess of West Götaland, whose maternal grandfather was Olof the Sharp-sighted, the king of Nerike.

His mother sent him to his foster-father Bove in West Götaland, where he grew up with his foster-brother Saxe who was surnamed Flette.

When Olof heard of his father's death, he assembled the men who were willing to follow him and went to his kinsmen in Nerike, because after his father's atrocities, the Swedes had grown hostile towards the Ynglings.

When the Swedes learnt that Olof and his kin had sought refuge in Nerike, they were attacked and had to head west through deep and mountainous forests (Kilsbergen) to Lake Vänern and the estuary of Klarälven (where Karlstad is now situated). Here, they settled and cleared land. Soon they had created a whole province called Värmland, where they could make a good living.

When the Swedes learnt that Olof was clearing land, they were amused and called him the Tree-feller. Olof married a woman named Solveig who was a daughter of Halfdan Guldtand of Soleyar. Olof and Solveigh had two sons, Ingjald Olofsson and Halfdan Hvitbeinn, who were brought up in Soleyar in the house of his mother's uncle Sölve.

Because of king Ivar Vidfamne and his harsh rule many Swedes emigrated to Värmland, and they became so numerous that the province could not sustain them. The land was afflicted by famine of which the Swedes accused the king. It was an old tradition in Sweden of holding the king responsible for the wealth of the land (see Domalde). The Swedes accused Olof of neglecting his sacrifices to the gods and believed that this was the cause of the famine.

The Swedish settlers thus rebelled against Olof, surrounded his house on the shores of lake Vänern and burnt him inside it. Thus he was sacrificed to Odin, like his ancestor Domalde.

Ynglingatal and Historia Norwegiae
However, Historia Norwegiae says that Olof succeeded his father and ruled as the king of Sweden in peace until his death.

The lines of Ynglingatal appear to say that he was a Swedish prince (svía jöfri), and that he was burnt inside his hall and disappeared from Gamla Uppsala.

Archaeology
Source
Along the lower parts of the river Byälven in Värmland, there are three large barrows, which legend attributes to Olof Trätälja. Moreover, there are many hillforts near this river and the northern shore of Lake Vänern testifying to a violent period. Archaeological excavations from one of the hillforts, Villkorsberget, show that it was burnt in a period corresponding to Olof (510–680).

Notes

King Olof Tratalja is of House Ynglinga which are descendants to House Munso from the 10th and 11th centuries. The previous editor from Gustav Storm of 1880 had shown King Olof Tratalja being from 1820s-1880s before vanishing when his house caught fire from attackers and fled for safety with his family. And a new ruler took over immediately after political corruption being a French General commissioned by Napoleon.

Norwegian petty kings
Olaf Tratalja
Tratalja, Olof